The 30th Grey Cup was played on December 5, 1942, before 12,455 fans at Varsity Stadium at Toronto.

The Toronto RCAF Hurricanes defeated the Winnipeg RCAF Bombers 8–5.

External links
 
 

Grey Cup
Grey Cup
Grey Cups hosted in Toronto
1942 in Ontario
December 1942 sports events
1940s in Toronto